(stylized as TOKYO GIRLS' STYLE) is a Japanese girl group formed in 2009, and was the first idol group created under Avex Trax after SweetS. The idol group originally consisted of five members: Miyu Yamabe, Hitomi Arai, Yuri Nakae, Konishi Ayano and Mei Shyoji. In December 2015, Konishi Ayano announced retirement from the idol group and the entertainment industry.

In April 2015, the group rebranded itself from an idol group and sought to be seen as serious post-idol artists, though they later performed at the Tokyo Idol Festival in 2017.

History

Debut and idol career
Avex created the group Tokyo Girls' Style in 2009 to capitalize on the rising demand for Japanese idol girl groups, a trend fueled by the success of AKB48. Members of the group later said that they had previously worked with the record label and were encouraged to audition for the new group. On December 1, 2009, the Japanese media began reporting about this new group, but Avex kept the identities of the group members a secret until January 1, 2010. Between January 1 and 5, Avex gradually released more information and launched the group's official website.

The group's debut single, was released on May 5, 2010, and peaked at  30 on the Oricon charts. Their second single, was released on May 19. Their first album, Kodou no Himitsu, which compiled their previous singles, was released in Japan on May 4, 2011, and peaked at No. 25 on the Oricon charts.

In order to break into other Asian markets, Tokyo Girls' Style re-recorded "Onnaji Kimochi" in Mandarin Chinese. This version of the song was included in the album entitled 心跳的秘密 (Xīntiào de mìmì), which was released in Taiwan on May 4, 2011, and in Hong Kong one week later. The group admitted that "They were worried that their singing is not good because the Chinese pronunciation is so hard [to grasp]."
Since then, the group has released more albums in these two markets as well as releasing a Chinese-language official site. In 2012, they made their debut performance in Singapore.

Tokyo Girls' Style's 11th single, "ROAD TO BUDOKAN 2012: Bad Flower", was released on October 17, 2012, and became their first single to debut on the Oricon TOP10 charts, at No. 4. They had their first solo performance at Nippon Budokan on December 22, 2012, becoming the youngest female group to perform at this venue.

In 2014, the group starred in two films, Count Five To Dream Of You (directed by Yūki Yamato) and Kotodama – Spiritual Curse, the latter part of a Japanese horror movie series. They also made their first US performance, at the 2014 J-Pop Summit festival in San Francisco.

Post-idol career

On January 6, 2015, the group announced that it would cease to be an idol group from April 2015 onward. They released their last single as an idol group, "Stay with Me", on March 3, 2015.

The group celebrated the fifth anniversary of their debut with the release of the compilation album 1st BEST ALBUM Kirari☆. They released their first post-idol single, "Never Ever", a month later on June 24, 2015. The title track was selected as the ending theme for the anime Fairy Tail. Before its release, member Konishi Ayano announced that she would be taking an indefinite leave of absence to focus on treatment for her lower back pain. Tokyo Girls' Style promoted itself as a four-member group as they proceeded to release their fifth album, Reflection, on December 23.

On December 30, 2015, Konishi Ayano announced her retirement from the music business, citing ongoing health concerns which she felt left her unable to fulfill her duties as a performer. The group has continued on as four members.

On August 5, 2017, the group made their first appearance at the Tokyo Idol Festival in over three years despite their previous announcement that they would cease all idol activities. The girls relayed that they wanted to broaden the scope of their activities and wished to "be regarded as both an idol and an artist". On October 25, 2017, the group simultaneously released two mini-albums: PERIOD.BEST ~Otona ni Narun Dakara~, which featured re-recordings of their previous idol hits, and PERIOD.BEST ~Kimete Ii yo Watashi no Koto~, which featured singles released in 2016 and 2017.

Members

Current members
 – (Leader) 
 – (Sub-Leader)
 – (Leader)
 – (Leader)

Former members
 – (Leader)

Discography

Albums

Extended plays

Compilations

Singles

Digital singles

References

External links
 Official Website 

Avex Trax artists
Japanese girl groups
Japanese idol groups
Musical groups established in 2010
Japanese pop music groups
2010 establishments in Japan
Child musical groups
Musical groups from Tokyo